The 2016–17 AJIHL season is the fifth season of the Australian Junior Ice Hockey League. It will run from 17 December 2016 until a yet to be determined date in 2017, with the formal structure of the league having been changed to incorporate 3 additional teams, each from a different state or territory. The AJIHL is the highest Australian national junior ice hockey competition.

League business
Ice Hockey Australia made the announcement that the Australian Junior Ice Hockey League would be expanding in the 2016–17 season. It planned to include teams from Queensland, South Australia and Australian Capital Territory into the regular season format after the previous season using a Tier 2 tournament for the 3 new teams. Due to cost of travel after adding 3 additional cities to the league, the season format was changed to a multiple weekend tournament format and the league was divided into 2 conferences. Two other issues faced at the beginning of the season were that there was no ice availability reserved in Melbourne, Victoria to schedule games for the Melbourne Glaciers and Adelaide was again experiencing issues with its main rink cooling system. With the first schedule originally announced and ready for December, the Canberra Junior Brave pulled out of the weekend and it is unknown if they would return later in 2017 in a future weekend tournament. With a shrinking junior talent pool in Melbourne, the Melbourne Whalers suspended operations for the 2016–17 season, leaving only the Melbourne Glaciers to participate. The Perth Pelicans would also suspend operations for the 2016–17 season, leaving the Perth Sharks as the only representation for junior talent in Western Australia.

Exhibition Games
Exhibition games were planned for both the Sydney Sabres and the Sydney Wolf Pack to keep the teams active as neither team had any training sessions allocated for them to use. These games did not count as regular season games.

February

Regular season
The regular season began on 15 December 2016 and will run as a weekend style tournament format for 2017.

December

January

March

April

Standings
Note: GP = Games played; W = Wins; SW = Shootout Wins; SL = Shootout losses; L = Losses; GF = Goals for; GA = Goals against; GDF = Goal differential; PTS = Points

The regular season league standings are as follows:

References

External links
Ice Hockey Australia
AJIHL Coverage - Hewitt Sports

AJIHL
AJIHL
AJIHL
Australian Junior Ice Hockey League